Gordon Park is a public park located in Cleveland, Ohio, in the United States. A part of the Cleveland Public Parks District, the park opened in 1893 and is situated on 122 acres of land adjacent Lake Erie on the city's East Side. It is named in honor of philanthropist and industrialist William J. Gordon, who originally owned and developed the land as part of his estate. In 1978 the section of the park adjacent to the lakeshore was incorporated, along with five other individual recreational areas along the lake, into the larger state-funded district known as Cleveland Lakefront State Park. The Lakefront State Park headquarters are located in Gordon Park. In April 2013, Cleveland City Council approved a 99-year leasing of Gordon Park to the Cleveland Metroparks system.

History
Gordon, one of the founders of the Cleveland Iron Mining Company, was responsible for initially landscaping the stretch of land, with the specific intention of bequeathing it to the City of Cleveland as a public recreation area.

References

Parks in Cleveland
Urban public parks
St. Clair-Superior